Huang Chia-hsin (born 7 July 1984) is a badminton player and coach from Taiwan.

Career 
Huang was among the first group of students in Song Shan Senior High School's new badminton club. A 2002 Min Sheng Bao article said, "Huang Chia-hsin is 164 cm tall, which is considered petite, but her footwork is good, and her personality is cheerful." She competed at the 2005 World Badminton Championships in Anaheim and reached the second round, losing to first seed Zhang Ning from China. Her older sister Huang Chia-chi is also a badminton player and taught her the sport. Huang was the bronze medalist at the 1999 Asian Junior Championships in the girls' team event.

A 2005 article in Min Sheng Bao about the MMOA Cup National tournament said, "The disadvantage of Huang Chia-hsin's playing is that she lacks confidence in herself." She thought she had insufficient practice despite having practiced with the national team so was unsure about "defend[ing] her title". The article noted, "In the final, Huang Chia-hsin cut the ball sharply, successfully mobilized Jian Yujin, and defended well."

References

External links
 Chia Hsin Huang at tournamentsoftware.com (archive)

Taiwanese female badminton players
Badminton players at the 2006 Asian Games
1984 births
Living people
Asian Games competitors for Chinese Taipei